Aarzoo (transl. Desire) is a 1999 Indian Hindi romance film directed by Lawrence D'Souza stars Madhuri Dixit, Akshay Kumar, Saif Ali Khan, Amrish Puri, Paresh Rawal and Reema Lagoo. The film was primarily filmed in Mumbai, but some scenes were filmed in London and Edinburgh.

Plot
Dayashankar is a wealthy NRI living in London with his wife Parvati and daughter Pooja, who is the apple of his eye. Dayashankar also takes care of his deceased best friend's son Amar, who he regards as a surrogate son, and has always wished that he eventually marry Pooja. Studying in Edinburgh, Amar is overjoyed when he is invited to stay with Dayashankar's family in London. He eagerly prepares for his meeting with Pooja, with whom he has shared his childhood, and plans to ask her father for her hand in marriage as soon as possible.

However, Pooja has other plans – she has fallen in love with Vijay, a pilot and plans to marry him. This bitterly disappoints Dayashankar, as he has already tacitly promised Amar that he would marry Pooja. After some convincing from Parvati and Amar, who has decided to give up on marrying Pooja, Dayashankar agrees to his daughter's wishes. Though heartbroken, Amar puts on a brave face during Vijay and Pooja's engagement and subsequent marriage. 
However, tragedy strikes soon afterward as Vijay is declared dead in an aviation accident. Consequently, Pooja becomes a widow and becomes severely depressed; to make matters worse, she finds out she is pregnant with Vijay's child. Her father tells her to abort the child with the fear of society looking down upon their family and claims they will call her son a "bastard". Amar then tells Pooja he will take the responsibility to marry her and give the child his name. Amar willingly accepts this marriage and takes on the role of father to Pooja's baby boy.  When Pooja realises that Amar has always loved her, she begins to reciprocate his feelings.

In a twist of fate, after a few years the police reveal that Vijay is very much alive, and after his recovery he goes back to the UK to reclaim Pooja. Pooja is overjoyed to see him, but when Vijay sees that Pooja is happily married to Amar, he misunderstands the situation and believes societal rumours about Amar – that he had planned Vijay's aviation accident so that he could marry Pooja. Vijay becomes so hostile towards Amar that he gangs up with Kailashnath, an old enemy of Amar's father who had killed him, and sets out for revenge by setting fire to Amar's factories and kidnapping Pooja's son, not knowing that the boy is his own son. Even though Pooja attempts to explain that she married Amar in order to give her child a father figure, Vijay continues to believe in the rumours about Amar. Dayashankar reveals that he plotted the murder of Vijay to Pooja and Amar who are extremely shocked.

Vijay teams up with Kailashnath and kidnaps Rahul, not knowing that it is his own son. Then after learning the truth, he helps get his son back.

Finally, Vijay, Dayashankar, and Amar begin to cook up a plan to retrieve Vijay's son from Kailashnath. When they all finally get near Kailashnath and his gang, Kailashnath shoots Amar multiple times, but Amar uses his body as a shield to protect the child, whereupon Dayashankar intervenes to shoot Kailashnath to death. Amar slowly passes away, surrounded by a sobbing Pooja, a regretful Vijay, their rescued son, and a saddened Dayashankar. Pooja and Vijay reconcile and honour Amar after his death.

Cast
 Madhuri Dixit as Pooja
 Akshay Kumar as Vijay Khanna / Devaa 
 Saif Ali Khan as Amar
 Amrish Puri as Dayashankar
 Paresh Rawal as Kailashnath
 Laxmikant Berde 
 Tej Sapru
 Mukesh Rishi
 Mohan Joshi as Rajpal
 Aruna Irani as Vijay's mother
 Reema Lagoo as Parvati (Pooja's mother)
 Yunus Parvez

Soundtrack
The music was composed by Anu Malik and lyrics were penned by Anand Bakshi.

Track listing

External links
 
 

1999 films
1990s Hindi-language films
Indian romantic musical films
Indian aviation films
Films scored by Anu Malik
Films scored by Surinder Sodhi
Films directed by Lawrence D'Souza
Hindi-language romance films